The 27th Indian Infantry Brigade was an infantry brigade formation of the Indian Army during World War II. It was formed in March 1941, at Secundarabad in India and assigned to the 6th Indian Infantry Division. The brigade was used as Line of Communication troops in Iran and Iraq. Between July 1942 and July 1943 it was commanded by Alan Barker.

Formation
1st Battalion, 10th Baluch Regiment April 1941 to June 1945
4th Battalion, 8th Punjab Regiment April 1941 to January 1943 and August 1943 to June 1944
5th Battalion, 12th Frontier Force Regiment April 1941 to May 1942 and December 1942 to January 1943 and February to August 1945
159th Field Regiment, Royal Artillery June 1942 to January 1943
4th/5th (Cinque Ports) Battalion, Royal Sussex Regiment February 1943 to February 1944
87th Field Regiment, Royal Artillery March 1944 to May 1945
3rd Battalion, 11th Sikh Regiment May to August 1944
27th Field Company, Indian Engineers September 1942

See also

 List of Indian Army Brigades in World War II

References

Brigades of India in World War II